33rd Regiment may refer to:

Infantry regiments
 33rd Regiment (Vietnam People's Army), a unit of the PAVN
 33rd Punjabis, an infantry regiment of the British Indian Army
 33rd Regiment (3rd Burma Bn.) Madras Infantry, a unit of the British Indian Army
 33rd Regiment of Foot, a unit of the British Army
 33rd Infantry Regiment (United States), a unit of the United States Army

Cavalry regiments
 33rd Light Dragoons, a cavalry regiment of the British Army

Engineering regiments
 33 Combat Engineer Regiment, a unit of the Canadian Army
 33 Engineer Regiment (EOD), a unit of the British Army's Royal Engineers

Signal regiments
 33 Signal Regiment (Canada), a unit of the Royal Canadian Signals Corps
 33 (Lancashire and Cheshire) Signal Regiment, a unit of the British Army

Artillery regiments
 33rd (St Pancras) Searchlight Regiment, Royal Artillery, a unit of the British Army
 33rd Field Artillery Regiment, a unit of the United States Army

American Civil War regiments
 33rd United States Colored Infantry Regiment, a unit of the Union Army
 33rd Wisconsin Volunteer Infantry Regiment, a unit of the Union Army
 33rd Pennsylvania Infantry, a unit of the Union Army
 33rd Ohio Infantry, a unit of the Union Army 
 33rd New York Volunteer Infantry Regiment, a unit of the Union Army
 33rd Regiment Kentucky Volunteer Infantry, a unit of the Union Army
 33rd Illinois Volunteer Infantry Regiment, a unit of the Union Army
 33rd Indiana Infantry Regiment, a unit of the Union Army
 33rd Iowa Volunteer Infantry Regiment, a unit of the Union Army
 33rd Virginia Infantry, a unit of the Confederate States Army
 33rd Tennessee Infantry Regiment, a unit of the Confederate States Army
 33rd Regiment Alabama Infantry, a unit of the Confederate States Army
 33rd Arkansas Infantry Regiment, a unit of the Confederate States Army

See also
 33rd Division (disambiguation)
 33rd Brigade (disambiguation)
 33 Squadron (disambiguation)